Al-Alusi or Al-Aloosi is a surname. Notable people with the surname include:

 Mahmud al-Alusi (1802–1854), Iraqi Islamic scholar 
 Mithal al-Alusi (born 1953), Iraqi politician 

Arabic-language surnames